Marco St. John (born Marco John Figueroa, Jr.; May 7, 1939) is an American actor who has appeared in films and television programs.  He is known for his role as the horny truck driver in the 1991 film Thelma & Louise and for playing Sheriff Tucker in the 1985 horror film Friday the 13th: A New Beginning.

Early life 
St. John was born in New Orleans, Louisiana, the son of Iris (née Davidson) and Marco Juan Figueroa, Sr.

Career 
He has had many TV roles, starred in many TV-films and had roles on soap operas. He starred on Search for Tomorrow in 1975 as Joey Kimball, as Paul Stewart in 1969-70 on As the World Turns and in All My Children.

St. John made guest appearances on TV programs such as Naked City, Route 66, Bonanza, Gunsmoke and Walker, Texas Ranger.

Personal life 
, St. John was living on the Gulf Coast, in Ocean Springs, Mississippi.

Filmography

Film

Television

References

External links

1939 births
American male film actors
American male soap opera actors
American male television actors
Living people
Male actors from New Orleans